McDyer is a surname. Notable people with the surname include:

Columba McDyer (1921–2001), Irish Gaelic footballer
James McDyer (1910–1987), Irish Roman Catholic priest and activist